Miles Away is an Australian hardcore punk band from Perth, Western Australia, formed in 2002.

History
Miles Away was formed in mid-2002 by Cam Jose and Adam Crowe who had a bunch of songs they wanted to use for an old school hardcore band. They then drafted in Chris Unsworth, the drummer from Adam's first band Alleged and Perth stalwart/enigma Dion, formerly of Boredumb and From The Ruins to play the bass. Nick Horsnell joined up on vocals in late 2002 to complete the puzzle. At this time the band was going under the name Burning Bridges, until they found a US band with the same name. With each of the members big fans of the mid to late 1990s positive old school hardcore comeback (i.e. Floorpunch, Ten Yard Fight, In My Eyes, Reach The Sky, Fastbreak etc.) the aim was to create a band that kids could stage dive and finger point to, while also fusing in elements of new school hardcore.

The band's second album, Consequences was released in January 2006.

Miles Away recorded their 2010 album Endless Roads with producer Dean Baltulonis (Sick of It All, American Nightmare, No Warning, Modern Life is War) at The Wild Arctic Recording Studio in New York City. The album was released in August through Resist Records (Australia) and Anchors Aweigh Records (Europe). Before Endless Roads was released, Miles Away began recording the Memory Embraced 7" which include two new songs that did not appear on the new record, which they are self-releasing. Ash Pederick decided to leave the band and focus on his own project in Blkout. Colton Vaughan Jolliffe (formally of Perth hardcore act Something More) is currently filling in on bass while the band is on tour. It is unclear if he will become a permanent member of the band and did not take part in the recording of Endless Roads (It is believed that as per the demo, Adam recorded the bass tracks for the new record). Miles Away will hit the road harder than ever in preparation for the release starting in June with a full Australian tour with fellow Perth friends and Resist Records label mates, Break Even, Melbourne's Hopeless and The Broderick as part of "The I'd Rather Be Giggin' Tour" to be followed by a European tour with Cruel Hand and The Carrier.

Since the release of Endless Roads, last five years have been spent growing, learning, touring, loving, celebrating and living. Five years ago, Miles Away released their last full-length album, "Endless Roads" and now they return with a new follow up LP titled, "Tide". Proving distance is no divide when it comes to songwriting, now Berlin based guitarist Adam Crowe collaborated electronically with Cam Jose on the song writing and structure for the new album, trading riffs and ideas via email. The process was slow going, not because of their residential locations, but due to a desire to fine-tune the song writing process and produce a record they all can be proud of for years to come. When it came to enlisting help to record, Miles Away, have a myriad of friends from all corners of the globe to call upon with former Defeater drummer Andy Reitz agreeing to lay down drum tracks on the album, while joining the band on bass is Adam's younger brother Jared Crowe of Perth outfit, The Others. Together they entered Getaway Studios in Boston with producer Jay Maas during July/August 2014, with the end result then mastered by Brad Boatright at Audiosiege. Pitching in on backing vocals are Zach from Bane, Jake from Dreamtigers, Dahei from Japanese band Cleave and renowned Aussie crooner Jamie Hay who put in time with A Death in the Family, Pitfall and Conation.

Discography

Studio albums

Demo
Miles Away 2SD (2003)

EPs
Armed with Hope (2003)
Make It Count (2004, Common Bond)
Brainwashed 7" (2006, Resist)
Memory Embraced 7" (30 July 2010, self-released)
Weathered 7" (15 January 2015, self-released)

Other releases
State of Affairs Split (split album with The Amity Affliction, Perish the Thought, Hi End Audio, Away from Now) (2004)

References

External links
 Bridge Nine Records Profile
 Resist Records Profile

Australian hardcore punk groups
Western Australian musical groups
Musical groups established in 2002
Musical quintets
Bridge 9 Records artists
2002 establishments in Australia